Rosalia Gillelovna "Shoshana" Persitz (née Zlatopolsky; 16 November 1892 – 22 March 1969), also known as Shoshana Persitz, was a Zionist activist, educator and Israeli politician.

Biography
Rosalia Gillelovna Zlatopolsky was born in 1892 in Kiev in the Russian Empire (now Ukraine), the daughter of Hillel Zlatopolsky (1868–1932), a Zionist leader, philanthropist and co-founder of Keren Hayesod, and his wife, Fania (née Mirkin), a homemaker. Hillel Zlatopolsky had been decorated by France with the order of the Legion of Honor for his contributions to business. Persitz's brother Moshe died in Israel in 1956.

In 1909, she became active in "Tarbut” ("Culture"), an organization for the dissemination of Hebrew culture throughout the Jewish diaspora. In 1917, she founded the publication Omanut (Art) in Bad Homburg vor der Höhe, with her husband, Itzhak-Yosef Zelikovich-Persitz. In 1920, Persitz served as a delegate to the Zionist Congress in London. She studied in the universities of Moscow and Paris and received her degree in literature from the Sorbonne. In 1925, she immigrated to the British Mandate of Palestine, and adopted the forename "Shoshana". From 1926 to 1935 she was a member of the Tel Aviv City Council and head of the education department of the municipality and a member of the education committee of the Zionist Federation and member of the education department of the Vaad Leumi. 

In 1932, her father was murdered in Paris by one of his employees, Leon Laval, who later committed suicide.

Shoshana Persitz was Chairwoman of the Supervisory Committee of the General School System and of the General Zionists Women's Organization from 1948 to 1954. She was elected to the first, second and third Knessets for the General Zionists and was chairwoman of the Education and Culture Committee.

Death
Shoshana Persitz died in 1969. Her daughter, Yemima Milo, was a theater actress, director and acting teacher and one of the founders of the Cameri Theater. Another daughter, Shulamit, married Gershom Schocken, a politician and Haaretz editor.

Awards
In 1968, Persitz was awarded the Israel Prize, in education.

See also
List of Israel Prize recipients

References

External links

1892 births
1969 deaths
Politicians from Kyiv
Ukrainian Jews
University of Paris alumni
Ukrainian SSR emigrants to Mandatory Palestine
Women members of the Knesset
Israel Prize in education recipients
Israel Prize women recipients
Israeli publishers (people)
Soviet emigrants to Israel
General Zionists leaders
Burials at the Jewish cemetery on the Mount of Olives
Members of the 1st Knesset (1949–1951)
Members of the 2nd Knesset (1951–1955)
Members of the 3rd Knesset (1955–1959)
20th-century Israeli women politicians